Edwin Wainwright (12 August 1908 – 22 January 1998) was a British Labour Party politician.

Wainwright was educated at Darfield council school and Wombwell and Barnsley Technical College. He was a miner and a branch official and national executive member of the National Union of Mineworkers. For twenty years he served as a councillor on Wombwell Urban District Council.

Wainwright was the Member of Parliament (MP) for Dearne Valley from 1959 to 1983, when the seat was abolished in boundary changes.

References 

Times Guide to the House of Commons, 1966 & 1979

1908 births
1998 deaths
Labour Party (UK) MPs for English constituencies
Councillors in South Yorkshire
National Union of Mineworkers-sponsored MPs
UK MPs 1959–1964
UK MPs 1964–1966
UK MPs 1966–1970
UK MPs 1970–1974
UK MPs 1974
UK MPs 1974–1979
UK MPs 1979–1983